Cedar Lane, also known as Fountain House, is a historic plantation house located near Leggett, Edgecombe County, North Carolina. It was built in the late-1840s, and is a two-story, double-pile, three bays wide, vernacular Greek Revival style frame dwelling.  Also on the property are the contributing cook's house, dairy and electric plant, a smokehouse, tool shed, barn, and carriage house.

It was listed on the National Register of Historic Places in 1982.

References

Plantation houses in North Carolina
Houses on the National Register of Historic Places in North Carolina
Greek Revival houses in North Carolina
Houses in Edgecombe County, North Carolina
National Register of Historic Places in Edgecombe County, North Carolina